"La Boulette" is the first single taken from Dans ma bulle, an album by Diam's released on 21 February 2006. La Boulette debuted at number 3 on the French music charts and stayed number one for three consecutive weeks. Containing numerous references to fellatio, incest and violence, some consider the lyrics to be somewhat vulgar if unfamiliar with the genre's conventions. In 2007, "La Boulette" won a NRJ Music Awards in the category 'Francophone song of the year'. As of July 2014, it was the 88th best-selling single of the 21st century in France, with 323,000 units sold.

Track listings

 CD-Single
 "La Boulette (génération nan nan)" (3:39)
 "La Boulette (génération nan nan)" (Instrumental) (3:39)
 "La Boulette (génération nan nan)" (Video & Making of)

Charts

Certifications

References

2006 singles
Diam's songs
Ultratop 50 Singles (Wallonia) number-one singles
SNEP Top Singles number-one singles
Song recordings produced by Skread
Songs written by Skread
Songs written by Diam's